Defending champion Roger Federer defeated Jo-Wilfried Tsonga in the final, 6–3, 6–7(6–8), 6–3 to win the singles tennis title at the 2011 ATP World Tour Finals. It was his record sixth Tour Finals title and his 70th career title.

Seeds

Alternates

Draw

Finals

Group A
Standings are determined by: 1. number of wins; 2. number of matches; 3. in two-players-ties, head-to-head records; 4. in three-players-ties, percentage of sets won, or of games won; 5. steering-committee decision.

Group B
Standings are determined by: 1. number of wins; 2. number of matches; 3. in two-players-ties, head-to-head records; 4. in three-players-ties, percentage of sets won, or of games won; 5. steering-committee decision.

References
General

Main Draw
Scores

Specific

Singles